The 2006 World Snooker Championship (also referred to as the 2006 888.com World Snooker Championship for the purposes of sponsorship) was a professional ranking snooker tournament that was held at the Crucible Theatre in Sheffield, England. It started on 15 April 2006 and was scheduled to finish on 1 May 2006, but continued into the early hours of 2 May, ending at 12:52 a.m. BST. The final broke the record for the latest finish time in a World Snooker Championship final – 29 minutes later than the 1985 final – although it was not the longest-ever final.

Shaun Murphy was the defending champion, but he lost in the quarter-finals against eventual runner-up Peter Ebdon and became another World Champion who fell to the Crucible curse and could not defend his first World title.

The final was contested between Ebdon and Graeme Dott, and the victor was Dott by 18 frames to 14, earning him his first professional title in his 12-year career, and a £200,000 cheque.  The tournament was sponsored by online casino 888.com.

Tournament summary

Sponsorship
 Following new EU and UK legislation banning tobacco advertising, the 2006 World Snooker Championship could not be sponsored by Embassy as had been the case for the previous three decades. In January 2006 World Snooker – the sport's governing body – announced that the online casino 888.com would be the new sponsors of the event in the next five years.
 However, this decision led to conflict with some players who lost income from their own personal sponsors (seen on their waistcoats), who are rival firms of 888.com. Concerns were expressed among the sport's elite at the decrease in prize money and also in the number of ranking events (down to six for the 2005/06 season) since the loss of tobacco sponsorship. For the 2006 World Championship the winner's cheque was down 20% on what it was in 2005.

Pre-final
 Barry Hawkins made his Crucible debut this year. This was the first time that just one player made his Crucible debut.
 Future world champions Mark Selby and Neil Robertson both earned their first match victories at the Crucible. Selby's win over John Higgins in the first round was especially noteworthy, as Higgins had won both the Grand Prix and the Masters that season and was considered one of the pre-tournament favourites. Robertson would defeat Paul Hunter (see below) and Stephen Lee before falling to eventual champion Dott.
 Paul Hunter's first round defeat to Neil Robertson would turn out to be his last match as a professional. He was playing in pain from chemotherapy treatment for a rare form of stomach cancer. He eventually died of the disease on 9 October 2006.
 Six time finalist Jimmy White made his last appearance in the televised stage of the World Championships in this tournament. He lost 10–5 to David Gray in the opening round.
 In the last frame of the first round match between Stephen Hendry and Nigel Bond, Bond potted the black for what would have been a win, but the cue ball dropped in a middle pocket to tie the frame at 48–48. Bond still won, after the re-spotted black. This was the first match in the history of the World Championship  that a match was decided on a re-spotted black.
 The Crucible Theatre was evacuated due to a fire alarm. This occurred at the end of a frame 11 in the match between Steve Davis and Shaun Murphy. Meanwhile, on the other table Mark Selby was playing Mark Williams and was on a break of 26 when required to leave.
 Ronnie O'Sullivan compiled the highest break of the tournament with a 140 in his 13–10 win over Ryan Day.
 In the quarter-finals Graeme Dott was 12–8 up with only one more frame required to reach the semi-final of the tournament.
 Marco Fu defeated  Ken Doherty 13–10 and became the first player from Asia since James Wattana in 1997 to reach the semi-finals.
 Defending world champion Shaun Murphy lost to Peter Ebdon in the quarter-finals. This was the second year in a row that Peter Ebdon defeated the defending world champion in the quarter-finals.
 In the semi-finals Ebdon was 15–9 up and needed just 2 frames to go through to the final. Fu won the next six frames to level the match at 15–15. Eventually Ebdon won 17–16, playing the final balls with tears in his eyes.
 The tip of O'Sullivan's cue came off during the 14th frame of his semi-final match with Dott. There was a 15-minute break for emergency repairs, after which O'Sullivan made a 124 break. Dott won all 8 frames of the third session of the semi-final, going from 8–8 to 16–8. He eventually won 17–11 to enter his second World Championship final.
 Ebdon became the first player to reach the final without meeting a top 16 player. Murphy was the top seed as the reigning World Champion, but was not ranked within the top 16.

Final

 With intense tactical play from both players, the first session saw only six frames played, and the first day's play continued until 12:45 am. The third session on the second day also finished after only six frames.
The green, however, potted after hitting the jaws of the pocket. Ebdon reacted by doing a little pirouette movement and said jokingly to the Crucible crowd "now you know why I get them wiped so often!"
 The 27th frame was the longest in Crucible history and the longest televised frame on record at that time, lasting 74 minutes. It was won by Ebdon 66–59, reducing his deficit to 12–15. The following frame was won by Ebdon 84–0 in 11 minutes, the quickest of the final.
 Dott won his first frame of the evening session in the 29th frame, when Ebdon went in-off and conceded the frame, over five hours since winning his last frame and led 16–13.
 Ebdon won frame 30, as the tournament entered its eighteenth day, with the record for the latest finish looking set to be broken. The 1985 final between Steve Davis and victor Dennis Taylor finished at 12:23 am.
 Dott made a textbook clearance under tremendous pressure to win frame 31 with the last ball, which he celebrated with a loud "Come on!". The score became 17–14 at 12:22 am.
 Dott took the closely contested 32nd frame at 12:53 am. to win his first professional tournament. Before potting his last ball, Dott went over to kiss the awaiting trophy. Ebdon joined the minute-long standing ovation for the new champion, later paying personal tribute.

Prize fund
The breakdown of prize money for this year is shown below:

 Winner: £200,000
 Runner-up: £100,000
 Semi-final: £40,800
 Quarter-final: £20,800
 Last 16: £12,680
 Last 32: £9,600
 Last 48: £6,400
 Last 64: £4,000

 Televised stage highest break: £10,000
 Qualifying stage maximum break: £5,000
 Televised stage maximum break: £147,000
 Total: £896,240

Main draw
Shown below are the results for each round. The numbers in parentheses beside some of the players are their seeding ranks (each championship has 16 seeds and 16 qualifiers).
{{32TeamBracket-Info|paramstyle=numbered
| RD1 = First roundBest of 19 frames
| RD2 = Second roundBest of 25 frames
| RD3 = Quarter-finalsBest of 25 frames
| RD4 = Semi-finalsBest of 33 frames
| RD5 = FinalBest of 35 frames

|15 April| Shaun Murphy (1)|10| James Wattana|4

|15 & 16 April| Steve Davis (16)|10| Andy Hicks|4

|19 & 20 April| Jimmy White (9)|5| David Gray|10|19 April| Peter Ebdon (8)|10| Michael Holt|8

|17 & 18 April| Matthew Stevens (5)|10| Joe Swail|5

|16 & 17 April| Ken Doherty (12)|10| Barry Hawkins|1

|18 April| Alan McManus (13)|3| Marco Fu|10|16 & 17 April| Stephen Maguire (4)|10| Mark King|6

|18 & 19 April| Stephen Hendry (3)|9| Nigel Bond|10|15 & 16 April| Graeme Dott (14)|10| John Parrott|3

|15 & 16 April| Stephen Lee (11)|10| Ali Carter|8

|17 April| Paul Hunter (6)|5| Neil Robertson|10|15 & 16 April| John Higgins (7)|4| Mark Selby|10|17 & 18 April| Mark Williams (10)|10| Anthony Hamilton|1

|19 & 20 April| Joe Perry (15)|3| Ryan Day|10|18 & 19 April| Ronnie O'Sullivan (2)|10| Dave Harold|4

|20, 21 & 22 April| Shaun Murphy (1)|13| Steve Davis (16)|7

|23 & 24 April| David Gray|2| Peter Ebdon (8)|13|22, 23 & 24 April| Matthew Stevens (5)|8| Ken Doherty (12)|13|21 & 22 April| Marco Fu|13| Stephen Maguire (4)|4

|22, 23 & 24 April| Nigel Bond|9| Graeme Dott (14)|13|20 & 21 April| Stephen Lee (11)|9| Neil Robertson|13|21 & 22 April| Mark Selby|8| Mark Williams (10)|13|23 & 24 April| Ryan Day|10| Ronnie O'Sullivan (2)|13|25 & 26 April| Shaun Murphy (1)|7| Peter Ebdon (8)|13|25 & 26 April| Ken Doherty (12)|10| Marco Fu|13|25 & 26 April| Graeme Dott (14)|13| Neil Robertson|12

|25 & 26 April| Mark Williams (10)|11| Ronnie O'Sullivan (2)|13|27, 28 & 29 April| Peter Ebdon (8)|17| Marco Fu|16

|27, 28 & 29 April| Graeme Dott (14)|17| Ronnie O'Sullivan (2)|11
|30 April 1 & 2 May| Peter Ebdon (8)|14| Graeme Dott (14) | 18}}

Preliminary qualifying
The preliminary qualifying rounds for the tournament were for WPBSA members not on the Main Tour and took place on 6 and 7 January 2006 at Pontin's in Prestatyn, Wales.Round 1Round 2Round 3'''

Qualifying
The qualifying rounds 1–3 for the tournament took place between 8 and 13 January 2006 at Pontin's in Prestatyn, Wales. The final round of qualifying took place between 14 and 15 March 2006 at the same venue.

Century breaks

Televised stage centuries
There were 46 century breaks in the televised stage of the World Championship.

 140, 139, 124, 109, 106, 100  Ronnie O'Sullivan
 137  Mark Williams
 135, 112  Ali Carter
 135, 125, 121, 118, 110, 103, 101, 100  Marco Fu
 135, 113, 110  Stephen Lee
 123, 122, 110  Mark Selby
 122, 117, 116, 112, 107, 107, 101  Peter Ebdon
 121  Graeme Dott

 119  John Higgins
 115  Anthony Hamilton
 113, 106  Shaun Murphy
 112, 106, 103  Matthew Stevens
 109  David Gray
 109, 109, 106, 103, 102  Neil Robertson
 104  Ryan Day
 102  Michael Holt

Qualifying stage centuries
There were 52 century breaks in the qualifying stage of the World Championship:

 147  Robert Milkins
 141, 100  Paul Wykes
 141  Jamie Burnett
 140  James Wattana
 138, 113, 108  Mark Selby
 138  Alfie Burden
 135  David Gilbert
 132, 124, 120, 101, 100  Mark Allen
 132  Robin Hull
 132  Gerard Greene
 130, 130, 124, 104, 100  Ding Junhui
 125  Shokat Ali
 124  Joe Jogia
 124  Joe Swail
 122, 119, 102, 101  Tom Ford
 120  Mark King
 118, 101  Mark Davis
 117  Mike Dunn

 117  Neil Robertson
 116  John Parrott
 113  Gerrit bij de Leij
 111  Paul Davies
 110  Ricky Walden
 109  Adrian Gunnell
 107  Stefan Mazrocis
 106  Barry Hawkins
 105, 102  Judd Trump
 105  Alex Borg
 104  James McBain
 103, 102  Lee Spick
 103, 100  Fergal O'Brien
 103  Dave Harold
 102  Nick Dyson
 101  Jin Long
 100  Barry Pinches

References

2006
World Championship
World Snooker Championship
Sports competitions in Sheffield
World Snooker Championship
World Snooker Championship